A flintlock is a kind of a firearm.

Flintlock may also refer to:

 Flintlock, a Joint Combined Exchange Training programme
 Flintlock (musical group), a 1970s pop group
 Flintlock mechanism, a firing mechanism
 Flintlock: The Siege of Dawn, a 2023 video game

See also 
 Operation Flintlock, a World War II campaign
 Operation Flintlock (nuclear test)